Pauline Kemirembe Kyaka also known as Pauline Kyaka, (born on 16 June1977) is a Ugandan politician and teacher. She is the district woman representative of Lyantonde District in the 10th Parliament of Uganda. The incumbent Woman member of parliament, Grace Namara Lutemba lost to Pauline Kyaka, her NRM rival.

Education 
In 1990, she attended her Primary Leaving Examinations from St. Maria Goretti Preparatory School, Kabale. She later joined St. Mary's College, Rushoroza for Uganda Certificate of Education and completed in 1994. In 1997, she attained Uganda Advanced Certificate of Education from St Theresa Girls Secondary School, Bwanda. In 2000, she was awarded a bachelor's degree of Arts in Education from Makerere University.

Career 
From 2005 to date, she worked as the director at St. Pauls Kindergarten Primary School, Lyantonde. Between 2000 and 2002, she was employed as the teacher at St. Gonzaga S.S., Lyantonde. From 2016 to date, she has been serving as the Member of Parliament at the Parliament of Uganda.

Other responsibilities 
She is on the Committee on Human Rights and the Committee on Health as a member at the Parliament of Uganda.

Personal life 
She is married. Her hobbies are; Netball, Making friends, Reading novels, news papers, Networking and Charity work.

See also 

 List of members of the eleventh Parliament of Uganda.
 Parliament of Uganda.
 List of members of the tenth Parliament of Uganda.
 Lyantonde District.
 National Resistance Movement (NRM).
Member of Parliament.

References

External links 
 Pauline Kemirembe Kyaka on Facebook.
 Website of the Parliament of Uganda.
 Website of Parliament Watch on Members of Parliament.

1977 births
People from Lyantonde District
Living people
Ugandan educators
National Resistance Movement politicians
Women members of the Parliament of Uganda
Members of the Parliament of Uganda
Makerere University alumni